Phla (Kpla), also spelled Xwla, is a Gbe language of Benin and Togo.

References

Gbe languages
Languages of Benin
Languages of Togo